The Denver Center for the Performing Arts (DCPA) is an organization in Denver, Colorado which provides a showcase for live theatre, a nurturing ground for new plays, a preferred stop on the Broadway touring circuit, acting classes for the community and rental facilities. It was founded in 1972.

The Denver Center for the Performing Arts is the largest tenant of the Denver Performing Arts Complex (DPAC) which is a four-block,  site containing ten performance spaces with over 10,000 seats. It is owned and partially operated by Arts and Venues Denver.

History
Both the DCPA and the DPAC were the vision of Donald Seawell. Finding himself at 14th and Curtis streets in downtown Denver one day and looking at the old Auditorium Theatre and the surrounding four blocks, Seawell had an idea for a first-class arts complex.  Seawell's original vision was much broader and included other entities (see Previous Entities below) that no longer are part of the Center.

Ground was broken in December 1974. By 1978 Boettcher Concert Hall — the nation's first in-the-round concert hall — was completed, along with an eight-story, 1,700-space parking garage. By 1979 the Auditorium Theatre had been renovated, creating the state-of-the-art Ellie Caulkins Opera House. Inside the auditorium, two cabaret spaces had been added.  The Helen G. Bonfils Theatre Complex opened with four theatres now known as The Wolf, The Singleton, The Kilstrom, and The Jones theatres.

The Temple Hoyne Buell Theatre was completed in 1991, the Seawell Grand Ballroom was added in 1998, and The Weeks Conservatory Theatre opened in 2002.

The Ellie Caulkins Opera House was completely renovated in 2005.

Venues
Temple Hoyne Buell Theatre — 2,880 seats
Ellie Caulkins Opera House — 2,225 seats
Seawell Ballroom — 1,095 capacity
Wolf Theatre — 610 seats
Kilstrom Theatre — 380 seats
Singleton Theatre  — 200 seats
Garner Galleria Theatre — 210 seats
Jones Theatre — 200 seats
Weeks Conservatory Theatre — 185 seats

Governance
Now led by President & CEO Janice Sinden, The Denver Center for the Performing Arts is currently the largest tenant of the Denver Performing Arts Complex. The Denver Center organizes, oversees, and presents work by the following entities:
  
The Denver Center Theatre Company (DCTC) was created in 1979 as the region's largest resident, professional theatre company. Under the leadership of Edward Payson Call (1979 to 1983), Donovan Marley (1984 to 2005), Kent Thompson (2005 to 2017) and Chris Coleman (2017 to present), the Theatre Company has created an impressive body of classic and contemporary drama and world premieres. In acknowledgment of this work, the DCTC received the 1998 Tony Award for Outstanding Regional Theatre. HIGHLIGHTS: Stage director Israel Hicks took on the challenge posed by Donovan Marley and directed August Wilson's entire 10-play Pittsburgh Cycle over a two-decade period starting in 1990. Kent Thompson launched the Women's Voices Fund (the first endowment of its kind in the nation to foster the work of female playwrights) and the Colorado New Play Summit.
DCPA Broadway & Cabaret was created by Robert Garner, presenter of national touring companies since 1961, who joined the Center in 1979. When Garner retired in 1992, his hand-picked successor was Randy Weeks (DCPA president and executive director of DCA until his unexpected death in 2014). Now led by John Ekeberg, DCPA Broadway & Cabaret presents Broadway touring shows and its impressive attendance record has made Denver a "pick" city. Disney selected Denver to host its pre-Broadway debut of Frozen and The Little Mermaid, plus Disney's The Lion King, The Book of Mormon, If/Then and Pippen among many others have chosen Denver to launch their national tours. DCA also produces cabaret including the original Denver-based comedy, Girls Only: The Secret Comedy of Women, and I Love You, You’re Perfect, Now Change, which ran for more than four years making it Denver's longest-running musical.
The Denver Center’s Education Department was started in October 1984 when the DCPA and the American National Theatre and Academy joined together to establish the National Theatre Conservatory, a three-year graduate acting program, which was phased out in 2012. DCPA Education was added in 1991 as a community school for children and adults in a professional setting. The department now engages with more than 142,000 students through on-site classes, in-school programs and its annual Theatre for Young Audiences production for PreK-3rd grade.
The Seawell Ballroom is a  facility with a maximum capacity of 1,029 people. This pentagonal shaped room with panoramic views of the mountains can accommodate a variety of functions and features its own catering kitchen, freight elevator, tables, chairs, portable dance floor, movable platform staging and a state-of-the-art lighting, audio, video and projection systems.
Previous Entities which have since left the DCPA include Denver Center Media and Wilber James Gould Voice Center (a consortium member of the National Center for Voice and Speech).  Denver Center Media was a full-service video and film production studio, was established in 1983 and received numerous international awards and Emmys for television production, direction and sound design. DCM productions have been broadcast nationally on PBS, cable and overseas networks. Productions include Top of the World, Colcannon, The Moscow String Quartet: At Play in America, Coors Field: Home at Last, Pamoja: A Coming Together and Memory of a Large Christmas. The Gould Voice Center was founded in 1983 and headed, until his death in 1994, by the noted otolaryngologist Dr. Wilbur James Gould and afterwards by world known speech scientist Ingo R. Titze. It was the only such facility in the world that is part of a performing arts organization.  While these entities, along with the other entities, were at the DCPA, the entire conglomerate was unique in the world.

Events

World Theatre Festival, 1982

The World Theatre Festival was held at the center in July 1982.  The festival (which had been held in Baltimore previously, known as the International Theater Festival) comprised a program of 114 performances of 18 plays, by theatre companies from 13 countries, across 25 days. It was organized by Al Kraizer, upon request by the city. The trademark for the event was abandoned after a year.

See also
List of concert halls

References

External links 
 
 

Theatre in Colorado
Regional theatre in the United States
Organizations based in Denver
1972 establishments in Colorado